The 1969–70 Polska Liga Hokejowa season was the 35th season of the Polska Liga Hokejowa, the top level of ice hockey in Poland. 10 teams participated in the league, and GKS Katowice won the championship.

Regular season

External links
 Season on hockeyarchives.info

Polska
Polska Hokej Liga seasons
1969–70 in Polish ice hockey